Tapinoma himalaica is a species of ant in the genus Tapinoma. Described by Bharti, Kumar and Dubovikov in 2013, the species is endemic to India.

References

Tapinoma
Hymenoptera of Asia
Insects described in 2013